Disa sagittalis is a species of orchid found in South Africa from south and southeast Cape Province to southern KwaZulu-Natal.

References

External links

 
 
 

sagittalis